Élson Falcão da Silva (born 16 November 1981), simply known as Élson, is a Brazilian former professional footballer who played as an attacking midfielder.

Club career

Early career in Brazil 
Élson was born in Conceição do Araguaia, Pará.

VfB Stuttgart and loans 
Élson debuted in the 2008–09 season for VfB Stuttgart on 26 October 2008 against VfL Bochum at home.  He came off the bench in the 56th minute for Ricardo Osorio, and ended up assisting Mario Gómez's second goal of the game, assuring their home win.

On 10 April 2009, Élson extended his contract at VfB Stuttgart until the summer of 2011.

On 1 February 2010, he left VfB Stuttgart and signed a half year loan deal with Hannover 96. He played in the second half of the 2009–10 season in seven games for Hannover 96 and scored one goal before returning to VfB Stuttgart on 30 June 2010.

On 18 July 2010, Hannover 96 and VfB Stuttgart agreed terms for a permanent move of Élson to Hannover. But on 22 July 2010, Hannover 96 did not stick to the agreement. On 30 June 2011, the contract of Élson with VfB Stuttgart expired.

FC Rostov 
In August 2011 Élson moved to FC Rostov.

Honours 
Campeonato Paulista 2002
Campeonato Brasileiro Série B 2003

References

External links 
 
 
 Élson at zerozero.pt 
 Élson at globoesporte 

Living people
1981 births
Association football midfielders
Brazilian footballers
Ituano FC players
Esporte Clube Vitória players
Sociedade Esportiva Palmeiras players
VfB Stuttgart players
Hannover 96 players
Associação Atlética Ponte Preta players
Cruzeiro Esporte Clube players
Goiás Esporte Clube players
Criciúma Esporte Clube players
Oeste Futebol Clube players
FC Rostov players
Campeonato Brasileiro Série A players
Campeonato Brasileiro Série B players
Bundesliga players
Regionalliga players
Russian Premier League players
Brazilian expatriate footballers
Brazilian expatriate sportspeople in Germany
Expatriate footballers in Germany
Brazilian expatriate sportspeople in Russia
Expatriate footballers in Russia
Sportspeople from Pará